Ren Liping (born October 21, 1978 in Beijing) is a female Chinese football (soccer) player who competed at the 2004 Summer Olympics.

In 2004, she finished ninth with the Chinese team in the women's tournament. She played both matches.

International goals

External links
profile

1978 births
Living people
Chinese women's footballers
China women's international footballers
Footballers at the 2004 Summer Olympics
Olympic footballers of China
Footballers from Beijing
Asian Games medalists in football
Footballers at the 2002 Asian Games
Footballers at the 2006 Asian Games
Asian Games silver medalists for China
Asian Games bronze medalists for China
Women's association football midfielders
Medalists at the 2002 Asian Games
Medalists at the 2006 Asian Games
2003 FIFA Women's World Cup players